Daviesia latifolia, commonly known as hop bitter-pea, is a species of flowering plant in the family Fabaceae and is endemic to south-eastern Australia. It is a slender, erect, spreading shrub with elliptic, egg-shaped or lance-shaped phyllodes and orange-yellow and maroon flowers in long racemes.

Description
The phyllodes are wavy with scalloped edges and have prominent veins. Juvenile phyllodes are slightly broader.<ref name="RBGV">{{cite web |last1=Jeanes |first1=Jeff A. |last2=Stajsic |first2=Val |title=Daviesia latifolia |url=https://vicflora.rbg.vic.gov.au/flora/taxon/0a47f243-e3be-451e-b178-75eeb33a2647 |publisher=Royal Botanic Gardens, Victoria |access-date=1 February 2022}}</ref>

TaxonomyDaviesia latifolia was first formally described in 1811 by Robert Brown in Aiton's Hortus Kewensis. The specific epithet (latifolia'') means "broad-leaved".

Distribution and habitat
It is also common in dry woodlands in Tasmania.

Ecology
This daviesia provides nectar for a range of insects and native birds.

Uses

Use in horticulture
The species is useful as an ornamental, as a windbreak and in nitrogen-fixing. It prefers well-drained soil in full sun and is frost tolerant.

Other uses
The stems and phyllodes can be used with alum to produce a fawn dye used as a mordant. The phyllodes also have reputed medicinal properties, and were also substituted as hops to flavour beer. Early European settlers used the leaves as a drug to expel intestinal worms, including hydatid cysts, and also as tonic.

References

latifolia
Flora of New South Wales
Flora of Queensland
Flora of Tasmania
Flora of Victoria (Australia)
Plants described in 1811
Taxa named by Robert Brown (botanist, born 1773)